Lotsa Luck is an American sitcom that aired during the 1973–74 television season on the NBC Friday evening schedule. The series stars Dom DeLuise as bachelor Stanley Belmont who lives with his bossy mother (Kathleen Freeman), his sister Olive (Beverly Sanders) and her unemployed husband, Arthur (Wynn Irwin). Jack Knight stars as Stanley's best friend, Bummy.

Lotsa Luck is based on the British London Weekend Television series On the Buses.

Overview
The show centers around Stanley's frustration with his lazy, mooching brother-in-law, Arthur, who refuses to get a job, dresses like a slob (usually unshaven and wearing a bathrobe), is constantly smoking and eats like a horse.  Stanley works at the lost-and-found department of the city  bus company, supporting his entire family.

The show was ranked 52nd out of 80 shows that season with a 16.9 rating with Music Country USA.

Episode list

Home media
On November 29, 2005, S'More Entertainment released all 22 episodes on DVD in Region 1 in a 4-disc set entitled Lotsa Luck – The Complete Series.

Reception
Lotsa Luck failed to attract an audience, and the series was cancelled after one full season.

Lyrics
Lyrics: "I used to buy a pickle, it only used to cost a nickel, and a bus ride only used to cost a diiiime".
Stanley (Dom DeLuise): "Lotsa Luck"
Lyrics: "Them days can be forgotten, the world has gotten rotten". "Lotsa Luck", "Lotsa Luck", "Lotsa Luck". 
Lyrics: "Every day is getting tougher, "and it keeps on getting rougher, "a dollar isn't even worth a half a buck, "so in order to survive, "just to keep yourself alive, "what you really need today is".
Stanley's Mother (Kathleen Freeman): "Lotsa Luck?"
Arthur (Wynn Irwin): "Lotsa Luck"
Olive (Beverly Sanders): "Lotsa Luck"
Bummy (Jack Knight): "Lotsa Luck"
Stanley (Dom DeLuise): "Lotsa Luck"
Lyrics: "Lotsa Luck" (Screen Breaks)

References

External links 
 

1973 American television series debuts
1974 American television series endings
1970s American sitcoms
American television series based on British television series
English-language television shows
NBC original programming
Television series by CBS Studios
Television series created by Carl Reiner
On the Buses
Television shows set in New York City